The Publishing Triangle Award for Trans and Gender-Variant Literature is an annual literary award, presented by Publishing Triangle to honour works of literature on transgender themes. The award may be presented for work in any genre of literature; to be eligible, a work of poetry or fiction must be written by a transgender or gender variant author, while a work of non-fiction may be written or cowritten by a cisgender writer as long as it addresses transgender themes.

The award comes with a cash prize of USD1,000.

Winners
2016 — Nathanaël, The Middle Notebookes
2017 — Vivek Shraya, even this page is white
2018 — Reina Gossett, Eric A. Stanley and Johanna Burton, eds., Trap Door: Trans Cultural Production and the Politics of Visibility
2019 — Ely Shipley, Some Animal
2020 — Kai Cheng Thom, I Hope We Choose Love
2021 — Hil Malatino, Trans Care
2022 — Ari Banias, A Symmetry

References

Triangle Awards
Transgender literature